St. Georg (Sankt Georg) is a central quarter in the borough Hamburg-Mitte of Hamburg, Germany. In 2020 the population was 11,349.

History
In 1410 the articles 17 and 18 of a contract (Rezeß) between the Senate and the citizens were regulating the accommodation of the patients in the hospital St. Georg (S. Georg / Suente Juergens). This hospital still exists as the Asklepios Klinik St. Georg.

In 1868 the suburb St. Georg became official part of Hamburg, including the hospital for epidemic plague.

The murder of Morsal Obeidi occurred in 2008 in St. Georg.

Geography
St. Georg is south-east to the artificial lake Außenalster, which is the border to the borough Eimsbüttel. According to the statistical office of Hamburg and Schleswig-Holstein, the urban quarter has a total area of 1.8 km².

Parts of the quarter St. Georg are ranked as a good address by the office of city development and environment of Hamburg. The central situation of St. Georg and many places of nightlife, street cafés and shops is the source for the gentrification in this quarter since the 1980s. The city of Hamburg and the borough Hamburg-Mitte have special programs to change this quarter.

Because of the many gay-owned and gay-friendly nightclubs, cafés and shops, St. Georg is also considered as Hamburg's main scene for gays and lesbians. In the street Lange Reihe is the starting point of Hamburg's annual Christopher Street Day parade.

Demographics
In 2006 in the quarter St. Georg were living 10,551 people. 9.2% were children under the age of 18, and 13.2% were 65 years of age or older. 31.4% were immigrants. 629 people were registered as unemployed. In 1999 there were 6,882 households and 67.8% of all households were made up of individuals.

Politics
These are the results of St. Georg in the Hamburg state election:

Religion
The Domkirche St. Marien is a Roman Catholic cathedral in St. Georg. The present building dates from the 1890s.

Education
The main campus of the Hamburg University of Applied Sciences is at the street Berliner Tor.

There were 3 elementary schools and 6 secondary schools in St. Georg in 2006.

Culture

The Deutsches Schauspielhaus (theatre), founded in 1901, is located in St. Georg. In 2011 the Ohnsorg-Theater moved into the new theatre in the Bieberhaus next to the Hauptbahnhof. Among others the Sportverein St. Georg von 1895 is a sports club in St. Georg using the facilities in the quarter.

Infrastructure
The Honorary Consulate General of the Kingdom of Thailand established in Hamburg in 1881 is located in the street An der Alster 45 and covers affairs in the states of Bremen, Hamburg, and Schleswig-Holstein.

Health systems
The Asklepios Klinik St. Georg is a general hospital with 758 beds and 67 day-care places (e.g. for patients with AIDS). The hospital has 10 departments, including internal medicine, surgery (including urology), neurology, neurosurgery, anaesthetics and intensive care and ambulant surgery. The hospital is specialized among others for heart surgery and oncology. It also provides the capacity to dispatch emergency medical services. The hospital is located Lohmühlenstrasse.

Since 2008 the hospital also houses the Asklepios Medical School, a private medical school run by the Asklepios Kliniken Hamburg and the Hungarian Semmelweis University.

In 2006 there were 67 physicians in private practice and 9 pharmacies.

Transportation
St. Georg is serviced by the rapid transit system of the city train and the underground railway with the Lohmühlenstraße station and the Berliner Tor station. Public transport is also provided by buses.

Hamburg's central railway station is located in St. Georg, also the central bus station, for long distance buses to many cities in Europe.

According to the Department of Motor Vehicles (Kraftfahrt-Bundesamt), in St. Georg were 2,134 private cars registered (205 cars/1000 people).

Notes

References
 Statistical office Nord of Hamburg and Schleswig-Holstein, official website Statistisches Amt für Hamburg und Schleswig-Holstein 
 Hospitals in Hamburg 2006, Government Agency for Social Affairs, Family Affairs, Health and Environment of Hamburg website 
 D. Boedecker, Die Entwicklung der Hamburgischen Hospitäler seit Gründung der Stadt bis 1800 aus ärztlicher Sicht, Hamburg 1977  Found also: JS 34 in Das virtuelle Hamburgische Urkundenbuch website Virtual Hamburg contract book

External links

Quarters of Hamburg
Gay villages in Germany
Hamburg-Mitte